Roger Wayne Bailey is a New Zealand former rugby league footballer and coach who represented New Zealand thirty times between 1961 and 1970. His brother Gary also played for New Zealand while his brother Bob later coached New Zealand and his son David was also a professional player. Bailey is of New Zealand Māori descent.

Playing career
A member of the Ponsonby club, Bailey was an Auckland representative and was first picked for the New Zealand national rugby league team in 1961. He went on to play thirty test matches for the Kiwis and, in 1967, captained the Kiwis in two matches. Bailey also represented the New Zealand Māori side.

In 1973 Bailey won the Hyland Memorial Cup as coach of the year in the Auckland Rugby League competition.

He joined the Maritime club in 1975.

Awards
Bailey was inducted as a New Zealand Rugby League "Legend of League" in 1995 and is an Auckland Rugby League Immortal.

In 2007 he was named in the New Zealand Rugby League Team of the Century at centre.

References

1942 births
Living people
Auckland rugby league team players
Maritime rugby league team players
New Zealand Māori rugby league players
New Zealand Māori rugby league team players
New Zealand national rugby league team captains
New Zealand national rugby league team players
New Zealand rugby league coaches
New Zealand rugby league players
Ponsonby Ponies coaches
Ponsonby Ponies players
Rugby league centres